George Archibald Sterling (October 26, 1836 – 1883) was a farmer and political figure in New Brunswick, Canada. He represented Sunbury County in the Legislative Assembly of New Brunswick in 1883 as a Liberal member.

He was born in Saint Marys, New Brunswick, the son of George H. Sterling. In 1858, he married Caroline Tilley. He served as a member of the provincial Board of Agriculture. Sterling died in office at the age of 47.

References 
The Canadian parliamentary companion, 1883 JA Gemmill

1836 births
1883 deaths
New Brunswick Liberal Association MLAs